Cobbville is an unincorporated community in Telfair County, in the U.S. state of Georgia.

History
An early variant name was "Cameron Mills", after J. W. Cameron, the proprietor of a local gristmill. A post office called "Cobbsville" was established in 1851, and remained in operation until 1935.

References

Unincorporated communities in Telfair County, Georgia